Southern Fleurieu wine region is a wine region in South Australia that is located on the Fleurieu Peninsula and the portion of the Mount Lofty Ranges extending north east from the peninsula to near Willunga in the west and to near Ashbourne in the east.

Extent and appellation
The Southern Fleurieu wine region is one of five wine regions forming the Fleurieu zone which located to the immediate south of Adelaide city centre in South Australia.  The wine region extents from Cape Jervis in the south west across the most of the Fleurieu Peninsula to the portion of the Mount Lofty Ranges located to the immediate northeast of the peninsula and finishing near Willunga on the west side of the ranges and near Ashbourne in the east side of the ranges.  It bounded by the following wine regions - McLaren Vale to its north-west, Langhorne Creek to its northeast and Currency Creek to its east, and by the Adelaide Hills wine zone to its north.  The term ‘Southern Fleurieu’ was registered as an AGI on 6 June 2001.  As of 2014, the region contains 50 growers and at least 19 wineries.

Grapes and wine

See also

South Australian wine

Citations and references

Citations

References

External links
Southern Fleurieu Wine Region Tourism homepage

Wine regions of South Australia